Nagqu, Nagchu in original Tibetan or Naqu, also known as Nagchuka or  Nagquka, is a town in northern Tibet, seat of the prefecture-level city of Nagqu, approximately  by road north-east of the capital Lhasa, within the People's Republic of China.

"Nagchu (...) is an important stop on both the road and railway line between Qīnghǎi and Tibet. In fact, this is where Hwy 317 ends as it joins the Qīnghǎi–Tibet Hwy (Hwy 109) on its way to Lhasa."

At the time of the visit in 1950 of Thubten Jigme Norbu, the elder brother of Tenzin Gyatso the 14th Dalai Lama, Nagchukha was a small town with only a few clay huts but was also the headquarters of the District Officer, the Dzongpön. It was on the main caravan route coming from Amdo to Central Tibet.

The construction is planned to start in 2011 and expected to take three years to complete.

With all months having a mean temperature below , due to the town's very high altitude, Nagqu has an alpine climate (Köppen: ETH), with long, very cold and dry winters, and short, cool summers.

Footnotes

Populated places in Nagqu
Township-level divisions of Tibet